Skull is the fourth album by the British thrash metal band Evile, released on 27 May 2013 in Europe via Earache Records and in North America via Century Media/Earache Records. It is the last to feature lead vocalist and rhythm guitarist Matt Drake, who left Evile seven years after its release.

Production 

On 31 January 2013 Evile lead guitarist Ol Drake announced that the band would enter Parlour Studios with Russ Russell to begin recording their fourth album. The band finished recording on 1 March. On 25 March the band announced that the album would be released on 27 May.

Track listing 

All songs written by Matt Drake, Ol Drake, Joel Graham and Ben Carter

Personnel

Band members 
Matt Drake – lead vocals, rhythm guitar
Ol Drake – lead guitar
Joel Graham – bass guitar
Ben Carter – drums

Additional personnel 
Russ Russell – production
Eliran Kantor – artwork

References 

2013 albums
Evile albums
Albums with cover art by Eliran Kantor
Earache Records albums